The All India Trade Union Congress (AITUC) is the oldest trade union federation in India. It is associated with the Communist Party of India. According to provisional statistics from the Ministry of Labour, AITUC had a membership of 14.2 million in 2013. It was founded on 31 October 1920 with Lala Lajpat Rai as its first president.

In Bombay by Lala Lajpat Rai, Joseph Baptista, N. M. Joshi, Diwan Chaman Lall and a few others and, until 1945 when unions became organised on party lines, it was the primary trade union organisation in India. Since then, it has been associated with the Communist Party of India.

AITUC is governed by a body headed by National President Ramendra Kumar and General Secretary Amarjeet Kaur, both the politician affiliated with Communist Party of India. "Trade Union Record" is the fortnightly journal of the AITUC.

AITUC is a founder member of the World Federation of Trade Unions.  Today, its institutional records are part of the Archives at the Nehru Memorial Museum & Library, at Teen Murti House, Delhi.

History

Background
The beginning of the labour upsurge against oppression and exploitation goes back to the second half of 19th century, with the emergence of class of casual general labour during British Raj in India. The self-sufficient Village economy was shattered with no new structures in place, creating impoverished peasantry and landless labour force.

The dumping of cheap industrial goods resulting in millions of artisans, spinners, weavers, craftsmen, smelters, smiths, potters, etc., who could no more live on agriculture also turned into landless labourers. This led to widespread famines in India through the period from 1850 to 1890 resulting in deaths of several lakhs and also reducing millions as beggars.

The anguish of impoverished masses, ruined peasantry was up in revolt which resulted in several movements even though crushed by the rulers. This background did help the 1857 revolt by princely states and the common masses against the disempowering policies of British rule.

Till this time trade unionism was not known to workers, they were reacting to extreme exploitative working conditions and very low wages. They formed themselves as 'jamaats' which were based more on social caste basis in order to fight back oppression of employers. This was beginning of organization by the workers even though not the trade unions in essence.

From 1905 onwards there was notable advance in the working class actions and it was more and more closing its ranks with the advance of freedom struggle in the country.

A strike took place in Bombay against extension of working hours. The printing press workers in Calcutta also struck work. Another great event of the period was strike by industrial workers of Bombay from July 24 to 28, 1908, in protest against the pronouncement of judgment sentencing six years imprisonment to freedom fighter Bal Gangadhar Tilak. There were street fights between workers and police and military of British rulers.

Lenin wrote about this strike, "The Indian proletariat has already matured sufficiently to wage a mass struggle, class conscious and political, and that being the case, Anglo- Russian methods in India are played out".

This also needs mention here that the Factory Act established in 1881, was promulgated in the background of competition being provided to British Companies by goods produced in India due to availability of cheap labour and long working hours.

Even then it was only for the industry where competition to foreign industrial goods was posed. It was amended several times within a short period of few years. It was blessing in disguise as regards working hours and weekly holiday etc. but the wages and working conditions continued to be pathetic. In seasonal industry no changes were brought about as it did not impact the competitiveness to British Industry.

The October Revolution in 1917 in Russia during First World War was a great impetus for Indian labour movement as the working class along with peasantry captured power first time in the history of mankind.

In 1918 great strike in cotton mills of Bombay started and soon it spread to other areas with 1,25,000 workers participating by January 1919. The strike against Rowlatt Act had great impact on the national struggle itself. In the first half of 1920, there were 200 strikes involving 15 lakh workers. The demands were for 10 hrs working and dearness allowance. Out of 97 strikes during July to December 1920, only 31 ended in failure. In all other cases there were successes to some extent.

It was in this heroic background that the preparations began on July 16, 1920 when a convention was held in Bombay which decided "to hold All India Trade Union Congress in Bombay". A reception committee with 500 members with Joseph Baptista as chairperson was formed.

Formation
The founding conference began on October 31, 1920, in Empire Theatre Bombay with Lala Lajpat Rai as the founding President in which 101 delegates from 64 unions with a membership of 1,40,854 from all over India participated with presence of political leaders of various shades of opinions such as Motilal Nehru, M.A. Jinnah, Annie Besant, V.J. Patel, B.P. Wadia, Joseph Baptista, Lalubhai Samaldas, Jamnadas, Dwarka Das, B W Wadia, R R Karandikar, Col. J.C. Wedgwood.

British Trade Union Congress attended as fraternal delegate. 43 other unions which could not join the conference expressed sympathy and full support. A few unions of government servants kept themselves aloof. The Ahmedabad Labour Association with six unions and 16,450 members right from the start functioned as separate organization under the patronage of employers.

Lala Lajpat Rai led a procession of 10,000 workers in the city of Bombay. Lala Lajpat Rai had declared "for the present, our greatest need is to organise, agitate and educate. We must organise our workers, make them class conscious and educate them in the ways and interest of the commonwealth". He also observed that labour "today had become an international factor and everyone's life all over the world had become interlinked. There would be no salvation until and unless the workers of Asia were organised and internationally affiliated".

In this first conference with Lala Lajpat Rai as president, Deewan Chaman Lal was the general secretary. Later on Pt. Jawahar Lal Nehru, Netaji Subhash Chandra Bose, V. V. Giri, Sarojini Naidu, C.R. Das and several of other political leaders of the freedom struggle were associated with subsequent conferences and work of AITUC giving impetus to the work.

AITUC in its second session in 1921 in Jharia had adopted a resolution of Swaraj (Complete independence from British rule), almost eight years before the Congress adopted such resolution in 1929.

In the aftermath of second World War the AITUC played significant role in the foundation of World Federation of Trade Unions (WFTU), in the conference held in London with 204 delegates and observers representing 670 million workers from all parts of the world. AITUC was represented by S.A. Dange, R.A. Khedgikar and Sudhindra Pramanik. This conference adopted workers charter.

National Conferences

Affiliates
partial list:
 Andhra Pradesh Auto Rickshaw Drivers and Workers Federation
 All India Bank Employees Association
 A.P. Mica Mine Workers Union
 Calcutta Hawkers' Men Union
 All India Defence Employees Federation
 Federation of Chatkal Mazdoor Unions
 Nikhila Orissa Beedi Shramika Federation
 Patiala Aviation Club Workers Union
 Pondicherry Textile Labour Union
 Powerloom Workers Union
 Punjab Breweries Workers Union
 Vegetable Market Workers Union
 Visakha Steel Workers Union
National Fuel Labour Union 
IT and Allied Employees Confederation
 National Federation of Indian Road Transport Workers
 All India ASHA Workers Federation
 All India fish workers Federation
  Indian Mine Worker Federation
  Colliery Mazdoor Sabha

See also
Indian Trade Unions

References

External links

Official website
Constitution of AITUC
Indianlabour - AITUC
Archive of AITUC documents
Indian Labour Archives - AITUC

 
Labour movement in India
Indian independence movement
World Federation of Trade Unions
Trade unions established in 1920
1920 establishments in India
1920 establishments in British India
Socialist organisations in India